The Smart Forfour (stylized as "smart forfour") is a city car (A-segment) marketed by Smart over two generations. The first generation was marketed in Europe from 2004 to 2006 with a front-engine configuration, sharing its platform with the Mitsubishi Colt. The second generation was marketed in Europe from 2014 after an eight-year hiatus, using rear-engine or rear electric motor configurations. It is based on the third-generation Renault Twingo, which also forms a basis for the third-generation Smart Fortwo. A battery electric version was marketed as the EQ Forfour beginning in 2018.

Petrol-powered Forfour was discontinued in 2019 as production of all Smart internal combustion models ended at that time. Production of the EQ Forfour ended in 2021. It was indirectly replaced by the larger Smart #1 crossover.

First generation (W454; 2004)

Production

The car was produced at the NedCar factory in the Netherlands in conjunction with Mitsubishi Motors. This is the same factory that produced Volvo 300 in the 1970s and 1980s and the Volvo S40 in the 1990s. To save production costs, the Smart Forfour shared almost all of its components with the 2003 Mitsubishi Colt.

The Smart Forfour was phased out from production in 2006 due to slow sales.

Equipment
Depending on the version, it came equipped with ESP, ABS (standard on all models), 14-inch or 15-inch alloy wheels or, optional, 16-inch ones (17-inch on the Brabus model), safety cell, a panoramic sunroof (or, optional, electric sunroof), height-adjustable driver seat, illuminated glove box, radio/CD-player, fog lights, front and side airbags (standard on all models), alarm, automatic air conditioning, electric front windows, and as options - multifunctional steering wheel, shift paddles, heated front seats, lounge seats, navigation and color display with telephone keypad or DVD navigation with a larger display, CD changer, window bags, rain sensor, automatic lights on the system (in poor visibility), leather package.

Marketing
The sales brochures state that the interior "is designed around the concept of a lounge"; to test this, Top Gear presenters spent 24 hours inside the Forfour. They said they would not buy the car due to its high price and poor driving dynamics compared to its rivals.

Following Smart's initial success for the fortwo in the U.S., and due to surprisingly high popularity in the Forfour, former Mercedes-Benz exec Rainer Schmückle revealed that officials were considering relaunching the car.

Forfour Brabus (2005)

Forfour Brabus is a version of Smart Forfour tuned by Brabus with a turbocharged Mitsubishi 4G15 engine rated ,  more than the Mitsubishi Colt CZT.

Engines

Transmissions
All models could be equipped with either a 5-speed manual or a 6-speed automatic (Softouch) transmission, except the 1.0-liter version and the Brabus version, which could only use 5-speed manual transmissions.

Second generation (W453; 2014)

The second-generation Forfour was jointly developed with Renault, reportedly sharing approximately 70% of its parts with the third-generation Renault Twingo, while retaining the trademark hemispherical steel safety cell, marketed as the Tridion cell. The Fortwo is assembled at Smartville, and the Forfour is manufactured alongside the Renault Twingo 3 in Novo Mesto, Slovenia. Smartville, where the W450 and W451 build series have been manufactured, underwent a 200 million euro upgrade beginning in mid-2013, in preparation for the C453 Fortwo. The second generation Forfour, along with the new Fortwo went on sale in October, shortly after their debuting at the Paris Motor Show.

The Smart Fortwo and Forfour is offered with a choice of manual transmission or double-clutch automatic — and no longer with the Getrag automated manual. Both models feature a wider track, overall width increased by 10 cm (over the second generation Fortwo), improved ride and improved noise isolation.

For the third generation, Autoweek projected that Daimler consulted with Ford to learn about Ford's 1.0-litre turbocharged inline 3-cylinder engine, in turn sharing information about its own Euro 6 stratified lean-burn gasoline engines.

The launch model "edition #1" was a limited period version, presented in Tempodrom, Berlin. Delivery is scheduled to commence in November 2014 with the Forfour 52 kW and 66 kW models to follow in December 2014, and twinamic dual-clutch transmission models in the spring of 2015.

Smart Fourjoy concept (2013)

Smart Fourjoy concept includes Smart's signature Tridion cell in polished full-aluminium, tail lights integrated in the Tridion cell, spherical instrument cluster, raised smart lettering milled from aluminium on the side skirts, pearlescent white on the bumpers, front bonnet and tailgate; headlamps without a glass cover, U-shaped daytime running lights, LED front and tail lights, transparent petroleum-coloured moulded wind deflector at the top of the front windscreen, on the A-pillars on the sides and on the rear roof spoiler; rear dark chrome seats, a piping-like line with the same petroleum colour as the plexiglass accents on the exterior, instrument panel with convex surface and touch-sensitive operating functions, spherical instrument cluster, single-spoke steering wheel, two smartphones mounted on the dashboard and on the centre tunnel, 55 kW magneto-electric motor, 17.6kWh lithium-ion battery, 22 kW onboard charger, two electrically driven skateboards on the roof, helmets under the rear seats, a high-definition camera.

The vehicle was unveiled at the 2013 Frankfurt Auto Show (without doors and roof).

Concept plug-in hybrid conversion
A concept version, never manufactured, of the Smart Forfour was converted as a plug-in hybrid by third-party vendors. It received an award from the Energy Saving Trust for the "Ultra Low Carbon Car Challenge" project.

Electric version

In 2013, Daimler projected it would produce an electric version of the Smart Forfour during the second generation of production, for launch in 2015. The battery-electric smart forfour electric drive entered mass-production in 2017 at Renault's Novo Mesto plant in Slovenia and was marketed in Europe, competing with other electric city cars such as the MG ZS EV, Renault Twingo Z.E (with which it shares many components), and Volkswagen E-up!, including the SEAT Mii electric and Škoda Citigo-e iV, rebadged versions of the E-up!. In 2019, it was restyled and rebranded to Smart EQ ForFour, after Chinese automobile manufacturer Geely took a stake in Daimler, becoming a 50–50 partner in Smart, and Smart pivoted to market electric cars only. The EQ ForFour was discontinued in early 2022.

Powertrain

All petrol models are available with a 5-speed manual or 6-speed twinamic dual-clutch transmission.

Sales 
248,856 second-generation Forfour have been produced, 14.9% of them (32,326 units) being electric models.

References

External links

 Smart USA (official USA site)
Press kit:
The new smart fortwo & forfour: Adding a new shine to a proven concept

2010s cars
Cars introduced in 2004
Cars of the Netherlands
City cars
Euro NCAP superminis
Front-wheel-drive vehicles
Hatchbacks
Rear-engined vehicles
Rear-wheel-drive vehicles
Forfour
VDL Nedcar vehicles